Calvin Wayne Schuneman (born May 7, 1926) is an American politician.

Born in Manlius, Illinois, Schuneman went to Bradley University. He owned an insurance business. Schuneman served in the Illinois House of Representatives as a Republican from 1975 to 1981 and then in the Illinois State Senate from 1981 to 1993.

Notes

1926 births
Possibly living people
People from Bureau County, Illinois
Bradley University alumni
Businesspeople from Illinois
Republican Party members of the Illinois House of Representatives
Republican Party Illinois state senators